Anthony "Tony" Ray Amati (born June 28, 1976) is an American serial killer who shot and killed three people during a series of "thrill-killings" in Las Vegas, Nevada between May and August 1996. The FBI was brought in to find Amati's whereabouts, adding him to the FBI's ten most wanted list in 1998. Following his arrest, he was sentenced to life imprisonment, and is currently serving his sentence in Nevada.

Early life 
Amati was born in Carbondale, Illinois. He and his family moved to Las Vegas in 1992. He graduated from Clark High School with honors in 1994. Amati was still in high school when he got a job as a telemarketer. During his murder trial, a doctor said he was highly intelligent, able to discern right from wrong, and exhibited many of the traits of obsessive–compulsive disorder. "He has the personality characteristics that you would see in a good accountant", the doctor testified.

Murders 
Before the initial spree, Amati along with two accomplices, 27-year-old Troy Sampson and 23-year-old Edward James, robbed a gun store of $30,000 in southern Las Vegas, as well as stealing 75 firearms. Their crime spree began on May 27, 1996, when Amati, Sampson and James fired over 20 rounds into 27-year-old Michael Matta in a parking lot in southern Las Vegas, ultimately killing him. Matta was homeless, and was reportedly rummaging though bags of trash when killed. In July, two blocks away from where Matta was gunned down, the trio shot 48-year-old John Garcia to death in his garage near Tropicana Avenue. 

Four weeks later, in August 1996, the trio fatally shot 22-year-old Keith Dyer just outside of a friend's home, killing him. Stacie Dooley, a friend of Dyer and a witness to the shooting, was shot in the leg. During Amati's trial, she started sobbing as she recounted how three masked gunmen were "laughing like it was a big joke" and jumped around as they shot Dyer 13 times. Dyer's mother died on September 22, 1999. Her husband later said she couldn't deal with the death of her son and had been extremely dedicated to pursuing his killers.

Investigation 
At the scene, Amati cut his hand, leaving blood that police eventually collected and used to implicate him. In October 1996, Amati, Sampson and James sold stolen guns to a dealer. Unknown to them, the buyer was an undercover policeman, and both Sampson and James were apprehended, while Amati remained at large. Their trailer was subsequently seized and searched by investigators, who uncovered the stolen weapons, which were eventually matched to the guns used to kill all three victims. Since Amati couldn't be located, his two accomplices remained in police custody until he was found. 

On February 27, 1998, Amati was officially added as number 452 on the FBI's ten most wanted list, and they subsequently took control over the case. It was found that in the two years Amati was a fugitive, he went under multiple pseudonyms including Anthony Ray Jones, Phillip D. Gitlitz, Debon Restivito and Shane William Wade. The FBI found that he was arrested multiple times in Utah, but managed to convince police that he was a different person each time.

While Amati was at large, he was featured in an episode of the popular television program America's Most Wanted, in which investigators involved in the extensive manhunt for Amati said that he was most likely armed and dangerous. They suspected Amati might be in Southern Illinois, because of family that was known to have lived there. Initially, after over fifty tips from that area, that theory ran dry. 
 
Days after the episode was broadcast, detectives received a tip from Georgia, and FBI agents were dispatched there to find him. On March 1, agents stormed Amati's hotel room in Atlanta and arrested him without incident.

Amati's father, Charlie Amati, pleaded guilty to a misdemeanor charge of obstructing a peace officer for giving an officer a fraudulent license with a photo of Tony. He was sentenced to 12 months of conditional discharge and fined $200.

Trial and imprisonment 
In 1996, Sampson pleaded guilty to possession of stolen property and being a convicted felon in possession of a firearm, and was sentenced to 20 to 50 months in prison.

Amati, Sampson and James were all charged with the murders, but because of evidence being withheld by the judge, Sampson and James' charges were dropped by the district attorney, but Amati's remained. 

In 1999, he stood trial, denying his guilt, claiming the murders were primarily committed by Sampson and James, and that he himself never pulled the trigger.

Sampson was released from prison in August 1999. On November 14, 2000, he robbed and burned down a Las Vegas convenience store. He cut the telephone lines to the store in an attempt to disable the alarm system, cut a hole in the roof to get inside, and cut the power lines to the store security cameras. However, Sampson missed one camera, which filmed him breaking into video poker machines, trying to drill open an ATM, and pouring lighter fluid around the store and lighting it on fire. 

Sampson faced a federal arson charge since the store was involved in interstate commerce. In 2002, he pleaded guilty to arson and sentenced to 150 months in prison. Sampson was released from prison on December 11, 2012. 

During the trial, Amati claimed he only participated in the string of killings out of fear of Sampson, and only went on the run since he thought no one would believe him even if he turned himself in. Amati was acquitted of killing Matta and Garcia, but found guilty of killing Dyer. During his sentencing hearing, he said "I'm so sorry this had to happen" and begged the jury for mercy. Amati's lawyers had argued that his age warranted leniency, and said it would be unfair for him to be executed when his codefendants were walking free. The jury ultimately spared his life and recommended life in prison with the possibility of parole. Although the sentence was the absolute best case scenario for Amati, Bruce Dyer said he was satisfied. "To me, it would be a living hell to be in jail for 40 years," he said.

Jurors said that while they believed Amati shot Dyer, they decided to spare his life due to the lack of other violent incidents in his life before and after the murders.

Amati is serving his sentence at the High Desert State Prison, and will become eligible for parole in 2038, when he is 62.

See also 
 List of serial killers in the United States
 FBI Ten Most Wanted Fugitives, 1990s

References 

Living people
1976 births
20th-century American criminals
American male criminals
Male serial killers
American people convicted of murder
American prisoners sentenced to life imprisonment
People convicted of murder by Nevada
Prisoners sentenced to life imprisonment by Nevada
FBI Ten Most Wanted Fugitives
Fugitives
1996 murders in the United States
Criminals from Illinois